is a 1928 Japanese film directed by Tomiyasu Ikeda. This comedy film showcases the acting talent of Denjirō Ōkōchi and acts as a complementary film to Yaji and Kita: Yasuda's Rescue, which is part of the Yaji and Kita series.

Versions
An 8-minute remnant of the film was released on DVD by Digital Meme with a benshi accompaniment by Midori Sawato. The version in the National Film Center is 23 minutes long.

References

External links

1928 comedy films
1928 films
Boshin War
Japanese comedy films
Nikkatsu films
Japanese silent films
Japanese black-and-white films